Titus Tendai Gwaze (born 8 June 1999) is a Zimbabwean professional rugby league footballer who plays as a  for the Sheffield Eagles in the Betfred Championship.

He previously played for Wakefield Trinity in the Super League and spent time on loan from Wakefield at Oldham (Heritage № 1407) in League 1.

Background
Gwaze was born in Zimbabwe.

Career

Wakefield Trinity
In 2019 he made his Super League début for Wakefield against the Warrington Wolves.

On 26 Jan 2021 it was reported that he had left Wakefield Trinity.

London Broncos
On 18 Feb 2021 it was reported that he had signed for the London Broncos in the RFL Championship.

References

External links
Wakefield Trinity profile
SL profile

1999 births
Living people
Halifax R.L.F.C. players
London Broncos players
Oldham R.L.F.C. players
Rugby league props
Sheffield Eagles players
Wakefield Trinity players
Zimbabwean rugby league players